Jan Baptist van Rensselaer (18 March 1629, in Amsterdam – 24 October 1678, in Amsterdam) was the second son of Kiliaen van Rensselaer, the first Patroon of the Manor of Rensselaerswyck.

Early life
Jan Baptist van Rensselaer was born in Amsterdam. He was the second son of Kiliaen van Rensselaer (1586–1643), and his first son by his second wife, Anna van Wely (c. 1601–1670). His father was a successful diamond and pearl merchant from Amsterdam who was one of the founders and directors of the Dutch West India Company, instrumental in the establishment of New Netherland.

Manor of Rensselaerswyck 
In the spring of 1651, Jan Baptist sailed from Amsterdam on the Gelderse Blom (Gelderland Flower). With him travelled twelve employees hired by the Patroon, recruited from places where the Van Rensselaers had other interests. Jan Baptist was the first Van Rensselaer to visit the colony.

In May 1652, he was appointed Director of the Manor of Rensselaerswyck representing his brother Johan van Rensselaer (1625–1663), the second Patroon. During his residence on the estate, he lived in a style befitting his position, having brought furniture, silverware, and other personal property of much value from Holland, including portraits of the members of the van Rensselaer family. In 1656, he provided the window pane representing the van Rensselaer coat of arms in the Dutch Church of Beverwyck . Not long afterward he returned to Holland, becoming one of the leading merchants of Amsterdam.

When he returned to Holland in 1658, he was succeeded as Director of the Manor by his brother Jeremias van Rensselaer.

Personal life
Jan Baptist married Susanna van Wely, and together they had:
Kiliaen van Rensselaer, who died without issue.
Van Rensselaer died in Amsterdam, Holland, October 24, 1678

Gallery

References

Notes

Sources
This article incorporates text from an article in American Historical Magazine, by W. W. Spooner (1907), a publication now in the public domain.

1629 births
1678 deaths
Dutch West India Company people from Amsterdam
Jan Baptist
People of New Netherland
Businesspeople from Amsterdam